Statistics of Allsvenskan in season 1933/1934.

Overview
The league was contested by 12 teams, with Hälsingborgs IF winning the championship.

Malmö FF was disqualified after 13 rounds. The reason was that rivaling IFK Malmö had learned that Malmö FF had given their players watches for Christmas, which presumably had happened in other clubs before. But it was a violation of the very hard amateur rules of the time. All nine of Malmö FF's matches during the spring was cancelled.

League table

Results

Footnotes

References 

Allsvenskan seasons
1933–34 in Swedish association football leagues
Sweden